Collier is an unincorporated community in Monroe County, in the U.S. state of Georgia.

History
The community was named after Cuthbert Collier, a pioneer settler. Variant names were "Colliers" and "Collier Station". A post office called Collier was in operation from 1875 until 1905.

References

Unincorporated communities in Monroe County, Georgia